Todo comenzó en Curanilahue (Everything started in Curanilahue in English) is the fourth book of the Chilean Felipe Berríos. It was published by Editorial Aguilar and El Mercurio in March 2006.

Review 
Todo comenzó en Curanilahue is about Curanilahue city and its interaction with the youth of Techo in Chile. In 1997 the first young people begin work to the present. Copyright of book are for the work of the foundation Techo.

Felipe Berrios was chaplain of the NGO Techo, from 1997 to 2010, when in May he travels to Africa.

References 

2006 books
Spanish books